Agneta Hannerz (1 July 1936 – 9 June 2018) was a Swedish sprinter. She competed in the women's 100 metres at the 1952 Summer Olympics.

References

External links
 

1936 births
2018 deaths
Athletes (track and field) at the 1952 Summer Olympics
Swedish female sprinters
Olympic athletes of Sweden
Athletes from Stockholm
Olympic female sprinters